Erik Harling (11 May 1910 – 16 November 1978) was a Swedish swimmer. He competed in the men's 200 metre breaststroke event at the 1928 Summer Olympics.

References

External links
 

1910 births
1978 deaths
Olympic swimmers of Sweden
Swimmers at the 1928 Summer Olympics
Swimmers from Stockholm
Swedish male breaststroke swimmers